Chignik Bay may refer to:

Chignik Bay, a bay located off Chignik, Alaska
Chignik Bay Seaplane Base, a seaplane base in the bay